In the geologic timescale, the Wordian is an age or stage of the Permian. It is the middle of three subdivisions of the Guadalupian Epoch or Series. It was preceded by the Roadian and followed by the Capitanian.

Stratigraphy
The Wordian Stage was introduced into scientific literature by Johan August Udden in 1916 and was named after the Word Formation of the North American Permian Basin. The Wordian was first used as a stratigraphic subdivision of the Guadalupian in 1961, when both names were still only used regionally in the southern US. The stage was added to the internationally used ISC timescale in 2001.

The base of the Wordian Stage is defined as the place in the stratigraphic record where fossils of conodont species Jinogondolella aserrata first appear. The global reference profile for this stratigraphic boundary is located at Getaway Ledge in the Guadalupe Mountains of Texas.

The top of the Wordian (the base of the Capitanian Stage) is defined as the place in the stratigraphic record where the conodont species Jinogondolella postserrata first appears.

The Wordian stage was part of the time in which the Zechstein was deposited in Europe.

Biostratigraphy
The Wordian spans the entire conodont biozone of Jinogondolella aserrata. It contains two fusulinid biozones:

Zone of Afganella tereshkovae
Zone of Neoschwagerina tenuis

Biodiversity
Olson’s Extinction, a worldwide loss of terrestrial vertebrate life occurred during the Early Guadalupian (Roadian, Wordian).

References

Literature

External links
GeoWhen Database - Wordian
Upper Paleozoic stratigraphic chart at the website of the subcommission for stratigraphic information of the ICS

 
Permian geochronology
.
Permian geology of Texas